Shuangmiao is a town in  Xiajin County in northwestern Shandong province, China, located about  west-northwest of the county seat and  east of the border with Hebei. , it has five residential communities and nine villages under its administration.

See also 
 List of township-level divisions of Shandong

References 

Township-level divisions of Shandong